Bulgaria competed at the 2008 Summer Paralympics in Beijing.

Medalists

Competing athletes

Athletics

Men's track

Men's field

Women's track

Women's field

Powerlifting

Officials
The chef de mission was Bulgarian NPC President Ilya Lalov.

See also
 Bulgaria at the 2008 Summer Olympics

References
 Official listing on the Bulgarian NOC website (in Bulgarian)

External links
 Bulgarian Olympic Committee

Paralympics
2008
Nations at the 2008 Summer Paralympics